Ezra Millington "Salt Rock" Midkiff (November 13, 1882 – March 20, 1957)  was a Major League Baseball third baseman who played in  with the Cincinnati Reds and in  and  with the New York Highlanders (renamed the New York Yankees for the 1913 season). Midkiff was nicknamed "Salt Rock" due to his birthplace of Salt Rock, West Virginia.

Major League career

Midkiff was 26 years old when he made his Major League debut on October 5, 1909, with the Cincinnati Reds. After spending time in the minor leagues, Midkiff was acquired by the Highlanders from the San Antonio Bronchos of the Texas League in 1912. Midkiff spent 1913 as the starting third baseman for the Yankees, but Fritz Maisel took the job midway through the season, and Midkiff was sold to the minor league Baltimore Orioles in August.

Minor league career

In 1914, Midkiff was a teammate of Babe Ruth before Ruth came to the majors.  After parts of two seasons in Baltimore, Midkiff ended the 1914 season with the Louisville Colonels of the American Association.

In May 1915, Midkiff was named the Colonels' manager. Midkiff, who was at the time suffering from a broken ankle, was named Manager of the club in place of John F. Hayden. At the end of the season, Midkiff was let go, and signed with the Memphis Chickasaws of the Southern Association. He continued to play in the minor leagues until 1921, and as late as 1940 managed the Huntington Aces of the class-D Mountain State League.

Death
Midkiff died on March 20, 1957 in Huntington, West Virginia.

References

External links

1882 births
1957 deaths
Baseball players from West Virginia
Cincinnati Reds players
New York Highlanders players
New York Yankees players
Major League Baseball third basemen
Greenville Spinners players
Winston-Salem Twins players
Akron Champs players
San Antonio Bronchos players
Baltimore Orioles (IL) players
Louisville Colonels (minor league) players
Memphis Chickasaws players
Atlanta Crackers players
Scranton Miners players
Wilkes-Barre Barons (baseball) players
Charleston Palmettos players
Charleston Pals players
Charlotte Hornets (baseball) players
Louisville Colonels (minor league) managers